is a 1982 anime feature film directed by Fumihiko Takayama, from a screenplay by Yoshimitsu Banno and Akira Miyazaki, which is based on the 1900 children's novel by L. Frank Baum, produced by Yoshimitsu Banno and Katsumi Ueno for Toho.

Cast

Production 
The film was produced in 1981 and it was the first animated feature in which Toho participated in the production. It is notable for its Western character design, unusual in anime. In fact Topcraft used to work for American animation studio Rankin/Bass at the time. Voice actress Mari Okamoto had already voiced Dorothy in the 1974 TBS dub of the 1939 The Wizard of Oz. This film's writer, Akira Miyazaki, also wrote for the 1986 anime television series of the same name.

Relation to the novel 
The film is known for staying particularly close to the novel, its primary elimination being the journey to Glinda, which is only now slightly less of a deus ex machina than in the MGM version. Also borrowed from that version are the red "magic shoes" rather than the silver shoes of Baum's text. Some familiarity with the later books is clear, as the houses are the same two-chimneyed domes found in the artwork of John R. Neill, who never illustrated the first Oz book. Glinda's appeareance is also borrowed from Neill's illustrations of Princess Ozma. It is one of the rare films to depict the various forms the Wizard appears to each of the travelers, such as the Beautiful-Winged Lady (shown to be a puppet rather than the Wizard in a costume, as in the book), the Terrible Beast (looking like an ordinary rhinoceros) and the Ball of Fire.

Music 
The music was written by future Studio Ghibli's composer Jō Hisaishi along with Yuichiro Oda and performed by Columbia Orchestra. The Lyrics were written by Keisuke Yamakawa. The single containing the songs was released in April 1981 (Catalog# CK-584), over a year prior the movie release; thus, it is possible that it was decided only later to use it as a soundtrack.

"Someone is waiting for me" (だれか私を待っている, Dare ka watashi wo matte iru) (Main theme) (Singer: Mitsuko Horie)
"What is 1+1?" (1＋1は何？, Ichi tasu ichi wa nani) (Insert song) (Singers: Mitsuko Horie and Koorogi '73)
A third song also sung by Horie can be heard in the middle of the film, but it remained untilted never having been released on record.

The English dubbed version featured new different lyrics by Sammy Cahn and Allen Byrns, all sung by Aileen Quinn. 
"It's Strictly Up to You" (Main theme)
"I Dream of Home"
"A Wizard of a Day"

Release and home media
Although it was produced for a theatrical release, the film was eventually released in Japan straight to VHS, Betamax and on satellite television (CS) on July 1, 1982. It was also broadcast on AT-X as early as December 19, 2002. The English version of this film, edited by Johann Lowenberg and produced by John Danylkiw, appeared on television and home video in the United States on October, 9 1983. Alan L. Gleitsman was the executive producer of Alan Enterprises, which did the English dub for the North American release. New Hope Entertainment was also involved in producing the English-dubbed version. It was distributed in English-speaking countries and territories, including the United States and Canada, by Alan Enterprises. Paramount Home Video released the English dubbed version on VHS, Betamax, Laserdisc, and CED in 1983 and on VHS in 1991.

However, the film was shown in cinemas in some countries in the 1980s, such as Czechoslovakia and Spain or in Latin America. The film was dubbed into the Czech and Slovak language except for the songs, which were performed by Japanese singers (from the original Japanese music version). Some other foreign dubs, such as the Italian, Spanish and Greek versions, had this premise edit as well, while the French, Dutch and Hungarian dubs had their own rendition of the songs.

Except for a Polish Japanese-language DVD the movie never got an official DVD release in any other country.

See also

The Wonderful Wizard of Oz, a 1986 Japanese anime adaptation of Oz
The Wizard of Oz adaptations — other adaptations of The Wonderful Wizard of Oz

References

External links
 
 The Wizard of Oz at Anime News Network
 
 Review at Anime News Network, June 17 2003

1982 films
1982 anime films
Toho animated films
1980s Japanese-language films
Topcraft
Animated films based on The Wizard of Oz
1982 animated films
Toho films
Japanese animated fantasy films
Japanese fantasy adventure films
Films about witchcraft
1980s children's animated films
Films directed by Fumihiko Takayama